Science 37 is an American clinical research company that specializes in decentralized clinical trials. The Science 37 operating system enables universal access to clinical research—making it easier for patients and providers to participate and accelerating the development of new and innovative treatments that impact patient lives. With the industry's first and only, technology-first Decentralized Clinical Trial Operating System™ (DCT OS), Science 37 enables workflow orchestration, evidence generation and data harmonization on a unified, seamless platform—configurable to enable any study and fused with expansive networks of telemedicine investigators, mobile nurses, remote coordinators, patient communities and connected devices.

History
Science 37 was founded in 2014 by Noah Craft and Belinda Tan, working out of LA BioMed at Harbor-UCLA Medical Center. Their team developed the Network Oriented Research Assistant platform, also known as the NORA platform, which includes video chat, digital self-photography, data collection, and electronic consent. Together, these features were used to conduct “site-less” trials. The platform also aided researchers in finding and contacting potential participants, and scheduling trial participants for in-home activities like questionnaires, mobile nurse visits, and door-step study medicine delivery. The Operating System, as it is now known, is configurable to enable any type of study, in any indication. This industry-leading platform can be customized to activate and operationalize even the most complex clinical trials.

Science 37 received its initial round of funding in 2015, with a $6.5 million investment, co-led by Lux Capital and dRx Capital. In 2016 the company's second round of financing resulted in $31 million in funding, and a 2017 round of financing resulted in $29 million. In March 2019, Science 37 secured $35 million in Series D funding; and announced a leadership transition with David Coman coming in as CEO in November 2019. In August 2020 Science 37 closed an oversubscribed Series D $40 million funding round led by Lux Capital, Redmile Group, and PPD, Inc. (other investors: Novartis, Amgen, Sanofi Ventures, GV, Glynn Capital, LifeSci Ventures, and Mubadala Ventures). In May 2021, Science 37 announced that they are to become publicly listed via merger with LifeSci Acquisition II Corp. The transaction values Science 37 at an enterprise value of approximately $1.05 billion at closing. It also positions Science 37 with a balance sheet of up to $250 million to fund its decentralized trial technology platform, extend into new adjacencies, and power the next generation in clinical research.

Partnerships
In 2015 Science 37 began working with Genentech in the recruitment of trial participants. In 2017 Science 37 then completed a site-less trial for AOBiome Therapeutics. This was the first “interventional, randomized, placebo-controlled trial” to be completed virtually. That year Science 37 also began planning site-less trials for Sanofi and Otsuka Pharmaceutical.

In March 2017, Science 37 announces partnership with Sanofi.

In December 2017, Science 37 announces partnership with Otsuka

In 2018 the company partnered with Novartis to plan several site-less clinical trials. Novartis also owns 10% of Science 37 from an early-stage investment in the company. Science 37 was already in the process of conducting trials with Novartis in acne, cluster headaches, and fatty liver disease.

In May 2018, Science 37 announces partnership with UCB

In January 2019, Science 37 enters into technology enterprise collaboration agreement with Boehringer Ingelheim

In October 2019, Science 37 partners with Keck School of Medicine of USC on the largest ever NIH-funded, telemedicine-based dermatology study.

In April 2020, Science 37 and AiCure Partner to Enhance Virtual Clinical Trials

In April 2020, Science 37 Partners with Advarra to Expedite Virtual Trial Research for COVID-19

In August 2020, ERT and Science 37 Partner to Deliver High-Quality Data during Virtual Trials

In October 2020, Science 37 and Signant Health Partner to Expand Access to CNS Research with Decentralized Clinical Trials

In March 2021, Science 37 and Medgate Partner to Further Globalize Decentralized Clinical Trials

In March 2021, Science 37 and Xperiome™ Partner to Increase the Efficiency and Speed of Rare Disease Studies for Patients and Providers

In March 2021, Syneos Health Partners with Science 37 to Transform Clinical Trials – Increasing Speed and Diversity

In April 2021, PPD and Science 37 Strengthen Collaboration to Advance Decentralized Clinical Trials and Accelerate Development

In September 2021, Science 37 and Foundation Medicine Partner to Enable Interventional Home-Based Clinical Trials in Oncology

References

External links

Medical and health organizations based in California
2014 establishments in California